Persian Gulf International Education Center (Persian: مرکز آموزشهای بین المللی خلیج فارس, Mirkâz-e Âmvâzeshihai-ye Bin Almilli-ye Xeliji-ye Fars) is a branch of Islamic Azad University located in Arvand Free Zone, Khouzestan, Iran.
the Islamic Azad Universities are chains of private universities headquartered in Tehran, Iran. The certificates issued by this university are recognized by the Ministry of Science and Higher Education.

Faculties
 Law
 Management
 Industrial

See also
 Islamic Azad University
 List of universities in Iran - includes list of IAU Universities
 Higher Education in Iran

References

External links
 

Universities in Iran
Buildings and structures in Khuzestan Province
Education in Khuzestan Province